Dragomirești is a commune in Dâmbovița County, Muntenia, Romania. It is composed of six villages: Decindeni, Dragomirești, Geangoești, Mogoșești, Râncăciov and Ungureni.

References

Communes in Dâmbovița County
Localities in Muntenia